Sitaram Shahi (born 22 May 1970) is a Nepalese swimmer. He competed in the men's 100 metre backstroke event at the 1996 Summer Olympics.

References

1970 births
Living people
Nepalese male swimmers
Olympic swimmers of Nepal
Swimmers at the 1996 Summer Olympics
Place of birth missing (living people)